The 2010 Rally International of Curitiba, officially 2010 Rally Internacional de Curitiba (30° Graciosa Rally), was the second round of the 2010 Intercontinental Rally Challenge (IRC) season. It was also the first round of the South American Rally Championship and the Brazilian Rally Championship. The rally took place over 4–6 March 2010.

Introduction
The rally was due to start with a  prologue on Thursday 4 March to determine the running order for leg one. However, this was cancelled due to heavy rain. The prologue route was also due to be used as the final stage of the rally, but was also cancelled due to the persistent rain that lasted throughout the event. The event consisted of a total of 15 gravel special stages covering  with all stages taking place in daylight. The rally was centred in the city of Curitiba, which is the capital of the Brazilian state of Paraná.

Confirmed entries for the event included Guy Wilks (Škoda UK), reigning champion Kris Meeke (Kronos Racing Team Peugeot UK), and the Brazilian Daniel Oliveira, who drove a Peugeot 207 S2000 for the Austrian Stohl Racing squad.

Results
Kris Meeke led the rally from start to finish, as he took his first victory of the season. Another British driver, Guy Wilks finished 46.7 seconds behind in second, with the Škoda of Juho Hänninen finishing third. Hänninen moves into the championship lead, after his six points in Brazil took him onto a tally of fourteen points.

Overall

Special stages 

 * The super-special had been due to set the running order for the first leg with the top ten running in reverse order from where they finished. With the stage's cancellation, it was announced that the competitors would go through the stages in championship order.

References

External links
 The official website for the rally
 The official website of the Intercontinental Rally Challenge

Rally International of Curitiba
Curitiba